Robert Otis "Griff" Griffith (born November 30, 1970) is a former American football strong safety in the National Football League. He played 13 seasons in the league, mostly for the Minnesota Vikings from 1994 to 2001. He also played three seasons with the Cleveland Browns, and two seasons with the Arizona Cardinals, In 2008, he retired as a member of the Minnesota Vikings. Griffith also served as an Executive Member of the NFLPA (National Football League Player's Association) for six years. Currently he is CEO and Chairman of Matador Enterprises Inc.

High school and college 
Griffith played high school football, basketball and track at Mount Miguel High School in Spring Valley, California (near San Diego) where he earned All-CIF honors. Griffith played college football at San Diego State University where one of his teammates was future St. Louis Rams running back Marshall Faulk. He walked on to the SDSU football team as an undersized cornerback, but quickly became an indispensable member of the team. He started 3 seasons and was the heralded defensive team captain. He was a second-team All-WAC selection in 1992. Griffith also earned his Electrical Engineering degree in 1994. After going undrafted in the 1994 NFL Draft, Griffith signed with the Vikings as an undrafted free agent.

NFL and pro football career 
After college, Griffith had a brief stint in the Canadian Football League playing for the Gold Miners. Soon after, Griffith had the opportunity to play in the NFL and joined the Minnesota Vikings. In his first two seasons, he was mostly used as a backup and as a special teams player before having a breakthrough year in the 1996 season. That season, he made four interceptions for 66 yards, and made 96 tackles. He was named All-Pro by Pro Football Weekly, and was second-team Associated Press All-Pro in the 1998 season after having a career-high of five interceptions, finishing fifth in the NFC. He made the Pro Bowl after the 2000 season after starting in all 16 games, making one interception and 104 tackles. Griffith broke their long-standing special team record for 29 tackles. After eight seasons with the Vikings, Griffth signed a free agent contract with the Browns during the 2002 offseason, where he became one of the most experienced members in a young defense. He started in 44 games with the Browns earning six interceptions and 408 tackles in his three seasons. He led them in tackles with 118 in the 2004 season. He was released on February 27, 2005 as a cap casualty by then recently hired head coach, Romeo Crennel, who was trying to rebuild the franchise following a 4-12 season. He then signed a two-year contract with the Cardinals, where he started his last season and was active in all 16 games, making 79 tackles and three interceptions for 30 yards. In 2008, he signed a contract to retire as a member of the Minnesota Vikings. Robert was also a three-time All-Madden Selection, earned the 1999 Ed Block Courage and NFLPA Unsung Hero Awards, NFL Special Effort Awards and the 2000 Minnesota Man of the Year Award.

Griffith has modeled for Bad Boy clothing in an ad that appeared in Rolling Stone, Vibe and The Source magazines and appeared in Sports Illustrated for Women 2000 Swimsuit Issue.  He also played alongside Vivica A. Fox in the Kelly Price vocaled remake of Shirley Murdock's "As We Lay" music video.  Griffith began the Robert Griffith Foundation during the 1998 offseason which provides college scholarships for at risk and disadvantaged youth throughout the country.

NFL statistics

Philanthropy
In 1998, he founded the Robert Griffith Foundation, a highly successful program which provides college scholarships to underprivileged high school seniors.  Effectively to date the foundation has sponsored 36 graduates from colleges across the US including West Point, University of Michigan and Stanford to name a few. To continue the success of this project, Griffith also initiated the Viking Challenge which targets K-6th graders and challenges them in five core areas of success:  responsibility, non-violence, academic improvement, drug and alcohol abstinence. Each participating student signs a contract to commit to improving in these areas and, if accomplished, receives recognition and is awarded admission to a Viking Home Game. To this day, the program has been highly beneficial to the schools, children and community with clearly positive results.

Personal life
Griffith resides in Southern California. An avid cyclist, he is also well-traveled and has spent much time in the Americas and Europe for both business and pleasure.

References

External links
Griffith NFL.com profile
NFL players profile

1970 births
Living people
Players of American football from San Diego
American football safeties
San Diego State Aztecs football players
Minnesota Vikings players
Cleveland Browns players
Arizona Cardinals players
National Conference Pro Bowl players
Sacramento Mountain Lions coaches
Sacramento Mountain Lions
United Football League (2009–2012) executives
People from Spring Valley, San Diego County, California
Ed Block Courage Award recipients